Nancio Carrillo (born 16 August 1950) is a Cuban boxer. He competed in the men's heavyweight event at the 1968 Summer Olympics.

References

1950 births
Living people
Heavyweight boxers
Cuban male boxers
Olympic boxers of Cuba
Boxers at the 1968 Summer Olympics
Sportspeople from Matanzas
20th-century Cuban people